himanshu lakra is an Indian politician and is member of the Sixth Legislative Assembly of Delhi. He is a member of the Aam Aadmi Party and represents Mundka (Assembly constituency) of Delhi.

Posts held

See also

Sixth Legislative Assembly of Delhi
Delhi Legislative Assembly
Government of India
Politics of India
Aam Aadmi Party

References 

Delhi MLAs 2015–2020
Aam Aadmi Party politicians
People from New Delhi
Living people
Year of birth missing (living people)